Michael Slaby is an American entrepreneur, currently serving as the chief strategist at New York-based nonprofit, Harmony Labs. He previously ran the Chicago-based startup he founded, Timshel, which developed the platform known as The Groundwork.

Background 

Slaby attended Brown University, where he earned an A.B. degree in English literature and Biochemistry. Slaby was the chief technology officer of Obama for America in 2008 campaign. 

In 2012, he rejoined the campaign as chief integration and innovation officer. When that campaign finished, he began work on social impact organizations that leverage technology to create social movements.

Hillary Clinton also used the technologies developed by Slaby and his team in her presidential campaign.

Slaby is the former chief technology strategist for TomorrowVentures, which is an angel investment fund for Eric Schmidt.

examines disinformation and promoting divisiveness

In 2021, Slaby authored a book entitled, For All the People: Redeeming the Broken Promises of Modern Media and Reclaiming Our Civic Life, in which he addressed disinformation, the encouragement of divisiveness, and those profiting off of it and conspiracy theories. He stresses that the rationalization offered by those reaping enormous profits off of Internet platforms used to communicate dialogue promoting them, "protecting free speech", is baseless because the free speech amendment of the United States Constitution relates to prohibiting suppressive actions by the government, not private entities. 

Slaby then examines how Facebook and Google are seen to have polarized their users, allowed hate speech, and created an environment in which conspiracy theories could thrive. He cites the social basis for the Internet entities to have optimized their profits massively in this way and he calls for reigning in those with such profound influence in the public sphere through new governmental regulations, engagement by politicians, encouragement of moral leadership, and collective action by users in order to reestablish healthy discourse.

References

Year of birth missing (living people)
Living people
Barack Obama 2008 presidential campaign
Barack Obama 2012 presidential campaign
People from Chicago
Brown University alumni